Peter and Alice is a play by American writer John Logan based on the meeting of 80-year-old Alice Liddell and Peter Llewelyn Davies, then in his thirties, in a London bookshop in 1932, at the opening of a Lewis Carroll exhibition. It was first staged in London in March 2013, directed by Michael Grandage.

Synopsis
The play is based on a meeting between Alice Liddell Hargreaves, the woman who inspired Alice, and Peter Llewellyn Davies, one of the boys who inspired Peter Pan, at the opening of a Lewis Carroll exhibition in 1932.  The play sees enchantment and reality collide as this brief encounter lays bare the lives of these two characters.

Original production
The original production was directed by Michael Grandage, staged at the Noel Coward Theatre in London in March 2013. The lead actors were Judi Dench as Alice and Ben Whishaw as Peter.

Cast
Ben Whishaw as Peter Llewelyn Davies
Judi Dench as Alice Liddell
Nicholas Farrell as Lewis Carroll
Derek Riddell as J.M. Barrie
Olly Alexander as Peter Pan
Ruby Bentall as Alice in Wonderland
Stefano Braschi as Arthur Llewelyn Davies / Reginald Hargreaves / Michael Llewelyn Davies

Understudies included:
 Stefano Braschi for Peter Llewelyn Davies;
 Georgina Beedle for Alice in Wonderland;
 Henry Everett for both Lewis Carroll and J.M. Barrie;
 Christoper Leveaux for Peter Pan, Arthur Llewelyn Davies, Reginald Hargreaves and Michael Llewelyn Davies;
 Pamela Merrick for Alice Liddell Hargreaves.

Reception
Reviews for the production were positive for the play. Michael Billington in The Guardian wrote: "It's not a play that shocks or startles by its insights, but the reward lies in watching Dench and Whishaw recreate the agony and the ecstasy of inherited fame.". Charles Spencer in The Telegraph wrote: "It’s a beautiful and searching play that will live long in the memory". Libby Purves in The Times wrote "A meeting of two childhood muses, played by Judi Dench and Ben Whishaw, breaks your heart open".

However, there was some criticism of the play. Henry Hitchings in The Evening Standard wrote: "this is a piece that uses lush language to compensate for its lack of real dynamism".

Other productions
Peter and Alice was staged by the small South Australian theatre company, Independent Theatre, which has an established relationship with Logan, in August 2014. Directed by Rob Croser, the production was staged at the Space Theatre at the Adelaide Festival Centre. It was the company's 100th production, in their 30th year of existence. The lead roles were performed by Pam O’Grady and William Cox. Reviews were generally good, with both the acting and Croser and David Roach's set design praised; however one reviewer found it "a bit too practiced".

Awards and nominations

London production

References 

2013 plays
American plays
Plays set in the 1930s
West End plays
Cultural depictions of Alice Liddell
Cultural depictions of Lewis Carroll